The seventh series of the British sitcom series 'Allo 'Allo! contains ten episodes which first aired between 5 January and 16 March 1991 and repeated between 6 July and 7 September 1992.

There is a gap of fifteen months between the broadcasting dates of series 6 and 7. Gorden Kaye suffered serious head injuries in a car accident in January 1990; causing him to lose some of his memory. As Kaye was slow to make a full recovery, the whole show's future was in doubt. Even when the seventh series did come about, it brought some changes. David Croft left the series, with Paul Adam taking over the co-writing; Mike Stephens became the producer for the show; Robin Parkinson took over the role of Ernest LeClerc from Derek Royle, who had died in 1990; Roger Kitter replaced Gavin Richards as Bertorelli; and the series also saw the reappearance of Sam Kelly as Captain Hans Geering, though only for one episode.

Unlike in previous series, there was no exclamation mark when the title "'Allo 'Allo" was shown on screen.

The following episode names are the ones found on the British R2 DVDs with alternate region titles given below them.

Cast

Episodes

References

External links

1991 British television seasons
 7
'Allo 'Allo! seasons